Mervyn Rose defeated Rex Hartwig 6–2, 0–6, 6–4, 6–2 in the final to win the men's singles tennis title at the 1954 Australian Championships.

Ken Rosewall was the defending champion and the first-seed but lost in a five-set semifinal to fifth-seeded and eventual champion Mervyn Rose.

Seeds
The seeded players are listed below. Mervyn Rose is the champion; others show the round in which they were eliminated.

  Ken Rosewall (semifinals)
  Tony Trabert (second round)
  Rex Hartwig (finalist)
  Vic Seixas (quarterfinals)
  Mervyn Rose (champion)
  Ham Richardson (quarterfinals)
  George Worthington (quarterfinals)
  Bill Talbert (first round)
  Clive Wilderspin (first round)
  Robert Perry (second round)
  Ian Ayre (second round)
  Owen Williams (second round)
  John Bromwich (semifinals)
  Abe Segal (second round)
  Neale Fraser (second round)
  Jean-Noel Grinda (second round)

Draw

Key
 Q = Qualifier
 WC = Wild card
 LL = Lucky loser
 r = Retired

Finals

Earlier rounds

Section 1

Section 2

References

External links
 

1954
1954 in Australian tennis